Preetz-Land is an Amt ("collective municipality") in the district of Plön, in Schleswig-Holstein, Germany. It is situated around Preetz. The seat of the Amt is Schellhorn.

Subdivision
The Amt Preetz-Land consists of the following municipalities:

Barmissen 
Boksee 
Bothkamp 
Großbarkau 
Honigsee 
Kirchbarkau 
Klein Barkau 
Kühren 
Lehmkuhlen 
Löptin 
Nettelsee 
Pohnsdorf 
Postfeld 
Rastorf 
Schellhorn
Wahlstorf 
Warnau

References 

Ämter in Schleswig-Holstein